Andrew James Gardner (born April 4, 1986) is a former American football offensive guard. He was drafted by the Miami Dolphins in the sixth round of the 2009 NFL Draft. He played college football at Georgia Tech. He has also been a member of the Baltimore Ravens, Cincinnati Bengals, Houston Texans, Philadelphia Eagles, and San Francisco 49ers.

High school career
A native of Tyrone, Georgia, Gardner attended Sandy Creek High School, where he was teammates with Calvin Johnson. Regarded as a two-star recruit by Rivals.com, Gardner was not listed among the top offensive tackle prospects of his class.

College career
Gardner was an outstanding offensive lineman that started 48 consecutive games for the Yellow Jackets as a left tackle, he also helped future NFL running back Tashard Choice lead the ACC in rushing in both 2006 and 2007. His streak of 48 consecutive starts (every game of his career) was the nation's longest streak in consecutive starts until Gardner underwent season-ending surgery to repair his left shoulder during the 2008 season.

Professional career

Miami Dolphins
Due to his surgery and subsequent inability to perform many of the combine and pro-day workouts, his stock dropped and he fell to the sixth round where he was drafted by Miami with the eighth pick (181st overall) of the 6th round in the 2009 NFL Draft.

Baltimore Ravens
After being cut by the Dolphins, Gardner was signed to the Baltimore Ravens practice squad.

Cincinnati Bengals
After being cut by the Ravens, Gardner was signed to the Cincinnati Bengals practice squad. He was waived on August 23, 2011.

Houston Texans
Gardner signed with the Houston Texans on August 29, 2011.

Philadelphia Eagles
Gardner signed with the Philadelphia Eagles on March 31, 2014. On August 28, 2016, Gardner was waived by the Eagles.

San Francisco 49ers
On December 21, 2016, Gardner was signed by the 49ers. He was re-signed on August 14, 2017. He was released on September 1, 2017.

Personal life
Gardner's wife’s name is Jennifer, and his parents are Jim and Christine Gardner.

References

External links
Georgia Tech Yellow Jackets bio

1986 births
Living people
People from Chamblee, Georgia
Players of American football from Georgia (U.S. state)
American football offensive tackles
Georgia Tech Yellow Jackets football players
Miami Dolphins players
Baltimore Ravens players
Cincinnati Bengals players
Houston Texans players
Philadelphia Eagles players
San Francisco 49ers players
Sportspeople from DeKalb County, Georgia